The Kösener Senioren-Convents-Verband (abbreviation: KSCV) is the oldest association of German, Austrian and Swiss Studentenverbindungen. It comprises roughly 105 German, Austrian and a Flemish (Belgian), Hungarian and Swiss Corps, all of which are based upon the principle of tolerance.

History
The KSCV was founded in Jena in 1848 and soon moved its venue to the nearby city of Bad Kösen in the northernmost German wine growing area Saale-Unstrut having its annual meetings at the nearby Rudelsburg. The Kösener monuments commemorate prestigious members of the Corps as well as the many fallen during the wars.

During the period in which the National Socialist regime of the Third Reich (Ger. Inevitably, this policy resulted in the forced closure and disbandment of the corps and, eventually, the KSCV. The dissolution of the KSCV was further ensured by Hitler after the May 1935 Heidelberg asparagus dinner disturbances, in which Corps Saxo-Borussia Heidelberg members had interfered with a broadcast speech by Hitler in which they sang satirical songs against the Nazis. The Hitler Youth, in particular, was a rival organization which gained supremacy as the premiere youth organization in Germany under the Third Reich.

The KSCV, which had an ambivalent relationship with the Nazi government, was reconstituted by 1950 primarily in West Germany, with fraternities from the now-Soviet-occupied East Germany relocating to the West. Upon reunification, the Eastern fraternities returned to their original locations.

Member corps
 Corps Athesia Innsbruck
 Corps Austria Frankfurt
 
 
 
 
 Corps Flaminea Leuven
 Corps Franconia München
 Corps Frankonia Prag zu Saarbrücken
 
 
 Corps Guestphalia Halle
 Corps Hannovera Göttingen
 Corps Hansea Köln
 Corps Hubertia Freiburg
 
 
 
 Corps Marcomannia-Breslau zu Köln
 Corps Masovia Königsberg (Potsdam)
 Corps Palatia Munich
 Corps Rhenania Heidelberg
 Corps Rhenania Tübingen
 Corps Saxo-Borussia Heidelberg
 Corps Schacht Leoben
 Corps Teutonia-Hercynia Göttingen
 
 Corps Suevia Freiburg
 Corps Suevia Heidelberg
 
 Corps Vandalia-Teutonia, Berlin

External links

English
 Reportage on Corps in English language (.jpg-scans only!)

German

  (of the two Corps associations)
 "Corpsstudent"
 Corps in Austria

 
Bad Kösen
Student societies in Germany
Student organizations established in 1848
1848 establishments in Germany